Chowdhury Abu Taleb (dead 1971) was an Indian politician. He was elected to the Fifth Lok Sabha from the Murshidabad seat in the 1971 Indian general election. An Indian Union Muslim League leader, he stood as an independent. He obtained 93,716 votes (34.38% of the votes in the constituency). He died in 1971, some two months after becoming a parliamentarian.

References

India MPs 1971–1977
1971 deaths
Indian Union Muslim League politicians
Year of birth missing
Place of birth missing
Lok Sabha members from West Bengal
People from Murshidabad district
20th-century Bengalis